William Burton Walbert (May 18, 1886 – December 2, 1959) was an American Southern gospel songwriter, singer, composer, and editor. He (co-)wrote many songs, and he was the director of the Vaughan School of Music in Lawrenceburg, Tennessee.

Early life
Walbert was born in Barren County, Kentucky on May 18, 1886. He attended the Vaughan School of Music in Lawrenceburg, Tennessee.

Career
Walbert worked for the James D. Vaughan Music Company, where he taught shape note singing schools. After James D. Vaughan's death, Walbert took charge of the school.

Walbert was also a music performer. In 1917, he joined the Vaughan Saxophone Quartet with Joe Allen, Ira Foust and Adger M. Pace. From 1923 to the 1930s, Walbert was a member of the Vaughan Radio Quartet, a band whose members included Pace, Hilman Barnard and Otis Leon McCoy.

Walbert (co-)wrote many Southern gospel songs, including Peace Like a River, Oh, What a Blessing, Tell It Everywhere You Go, and I've Never Loved Him Better.

Personal life and death
Walbert married Mable Grace Vaughan, James David Vaughan's daughter, in 1915. They had a son, James D. Walbert, who became a pianist.

Walbert died of a stroke on December 2, 1959 in Birmingham, Alabama, at age 72. His funeral was held in Lawrenceburg. He was inducted into the Southern Gospel Music Hall of Fame in 1959.

References

External links
William Burton Walbert on Find a Grave

1886 births
1959 deaths
People from Lawrenceburg, Tennessee
American male composers
Shape note
20th-century American singers
20th-century American male singers